Centralia/James T. Field Memorial Aerodrome, originally RCAF Station Centralia , is located  west of Centralia, Ontario, Canada.

History

Originally built as a part of the British Commonwealth Air Training Plan (BCATP), Centralia Airport was home to the No. 9 Service Flying Training School as of September 21, 1942. Pilots were trained for the Royal Canadian Air Force (RCAF) as well as other Commonwealth nation forces.

In September 1947, the airport was renamed RCAF Station Centralia. During military ownership, various types of aircraft were operated including the Avro Anson, Douglas Dakota, Beechcraft Expeditor, North American Harvard, and de Havilland Canada DHC-1 Chipmunk.

After military closure on March 31, 1967, the airport was renamed Huron Air Park and was home to numerous light manufacturing firms.

Airport owner/operator
New United Goderich Inc. has occupied the airport since 1997. It is a privately held corporation which does V.I.P. completions, exterior and interior, avionics and maintenance work for small to mid-size jets and turboprop aircraft.

References

External links
Page about this airport on COPA's Places to Fly airport directory

Registered aerodromes in Ontario
Airports of the British Commonwealth Air Training Plan
Transport in Huron County, Ontario